Rattlesnake weed may refer to several plant species used in folk medicine to treat snakebites, such as:

 Daucus pusillus
 Euphorbia albomarginata
 Hieracium venosum
 Stachys floridana

See also
 Rattlesnakemaster